State Route 602 (SR 602) is a  north–south state highway in the northern portion of the U.S. state of Ohio.

Route description
All of SR 602 is situated within the eastern portion of Crawford County.  No portion of this state route is included within the National Highway System (NHS).  The NHS is a network of highways identified as being most important for the nation's economy, mobility and defense.

History
The SR 602 designation was created in 1937.  Originally, the highway ran from its present southern terminus at SR 19 to its intersection with Old Lincoln Highway north of North Robinson.  Old Lincoln Highway was designated as U.S. Route 30N (US 30N) at the time, and later became US 30 prior to that route being moved to its present freeway routing.

SR 602 would remain as such until 1969, when the highway was extended north along a previously un-numbered roadway to its present northern endpoint at SR 103 in New Washington.

Major intersections

References

602
602